Rustom Sorabji "Rusi" Cooper (born 14 December 1922) is an Indian former first-class cricketer and lawyer.

Life and career
Cooper was educated in Bombay at Elphinstone High School and St Xavier's High School. A right-handed batsman, he made his first-class debut in the 1941-42 Bombay Pentangular Tournament, playing for the Parsees. In the 1943-44 and 1944-45 seasons he represented Bombay in the Ranji Trophy.

Selected to play for the Rest of India against Western India States in February 1944, Cooper went in to bat at number eight and made his maiden first-class century. He finished the season with 383 runs at an average of 76.60. He improved further in 1944-45, scoring 551 runs at an average of 91.83 with two centuries, one of them in the Ranji Trophy final against Holkar to help Bombay win the title.

Cooper moved to England in 1946 to study at the London School of Economics. He was signed by Middlesex and played one game in the 1949 County Championship. The following season he got a longer run in the side but struggled to make an impact, averaging just 19.63 for the county. He was a champion batsman for Hornsey Cricket Club for several seasons, scoring 1,117 in 19 innings in 1953 at an average of 139.62, before returning to India with his English wife to practise as a barrister. A serious knee injury ended his playing career soon after his return to India. He practised in India as a maritime lawyer until he retired in his nineties.

Cooper is the last surviving player from the Pentangular Tournament, which ceased after the 1945-46 season. He is also the longest-lived first-class player in the history of Middlesex. He turned 100 on 14 December 2022.

References

External links
 

1922 births
Living people
Indian cricketers
Middlesex cricketers
Mumbai cricketers
Parsees cricketers
Alumni of the London School of Economics
20th-century Indian lawyers
Cricketers from Mumbai
Indian expatriates in the United Kingdom
Indian centenarians
Men centenarians
Members of Lincoln's Inn